Carlos Gustavo Merino González (born 15 March 1980) is a Spanish former professional footballer who played as a midfielder.

Club career
Born in Bilbao, Biscay, Merino started his senior career with Nottingham Forest in the English Football League Championship, and signed in March 2000 for hometown's Athletic Bilbao – the deal being effective as of the 2000–01 season– where he struggled with first-team opportunities, also being loaned to Segunda División club Burgos CF.

After being released in January 2004, Merino joined CD Numancia. In 2004–05's La Liga he played and scored regularly, although the Soria side were relegated one year after promoting. He went on to have second-tier stints with Gimnàstic de Tarragona, UD Las Palmas and Albacete Balompié, also representing the first side in the top flight.

In the 2011 January transfer window, aged nearly 31, Merino moved abroad again, signing for Fußballclub Wacker Innsbruck in Austria and sharing teams with compatriot Iñaki Bea. On 15 September 2013 he moved countries again, joining Panthrakikos F.C. of the Super League Greece and being released on 7 January of the following year.

Merino returned to both his homeland and native region in July 2014, signing with Club Portugalete in Tercera División.

References

External links

1980 births
Living people
Spanish footballers
Footballers from Bilbao
Association football midfielders
English Football League players
Nottingham Forest F.C. players
La Liga players
Segunda División players
Segunda División B players
Tercera División players
Athletic Bilbao footballers
Burgos CF footballers
CD Numancia players
Gimnàstic de Tarragona footballers
UD Las Palmas players
Albacete Balompié players
Club Portugalete players
Austrian Football Bundesliga players
FC Wacker Innsbruck (2002) players
Super League Greece players
Panthrakikos F.C. players
Spanish expatriate footballers
Expatriate soccer players in the United States
Expatriate footballers in England
Expatriate footballers in Austria
Expatriate footballers in Greece
Spanish expatriate sportspeople in the United States
Spanish expatriate sportspeople in England
Spanish expatriate sportspeople in Austria
Spanish expatriate sportspeople in Greece